Polydistortion is the second studio album by Icelandic electronic music band GusGus. The album was released on 7 April 1997 on 4AD, serving as their first release on the label. The songs "Why?" and the band's cover of Slowblow's "Is Jesus Your Pal?" feature Emilíana Torrini on vocals. Most of the material on the album had previously been released independently, as the album GusGus in 1995.

As of March 1999, the album has sold 40,000 copies in United States and worldwide sales stand at over 150,000 copies.

Track listing

References

1997 albums
GusGus albums
4AD albums